Clairac is a commune in the Lot-et-Garonne department in south-western France.

People
Clairac is the birthplace of the 17th century poet and dramatist Théophile de Viau and of François de Labat.

See also
Communes of the Lot-et-Garonne department

References

Communes of Lot-et-Garonne